Pardillana is a genus of grasshoppers in the family Acrididae and tribe Catantopini, from Australia.

Species
Pardillana ampla Sjöstedt, 1920
Pardillana dubia Sjöstedt, 1921
Pardillana exempta (Walker, 1870)
Pardillana limbata (Stål, 1878)

References

Acrididae genera
Taxa named by Bror Yngve Sjöstedt